The 1979 Lafayette Leopards football team was an American football team that represented Lafayette College as an independent during the 1979 NCAA Division I-AA football season.

In their ninth year under head coach Neil Putnam, the Leopards compiled a 5–3–2 record. Tim Gerhart and Rich Smith were the team captains.

Lafayette played its home games at Fisher Field on College Hill in Easton, Pennsylvania.

Schedule

References

Lafayette
Lafayette Leopards football seasons
Lafayette Leopards football